Shirobako is an anime television series produced by Warner Entertainment Japan and P.A. Works, and directed by Tsutomu Mizushima. The series follows a group of five girls and best friends, Aoi Miyamori, Ema Yasuhara, Shizuka Sakaki, Misa Tōdō, and Midori Imai, who all begin working in the anime industry after their experiences in the animation club of their high school, only to be faced with the daily troubles and hardships the five must overcome. The focus is primarily on Aoi and her fellow staff at animation studio Musashino Animation as they work on two anime television series.

The series was broadcast in Japan on Tokyo MX from October 9, 2014 to March 26, 2015. Original video animation (OVA) episodes are included on the series' third and seventh Blu-ray Disc/DVD volumes, released on February 25, 2015 and July 29, 2015, respectively. Sentai Filmworks has licensed the series for release in North America, with Crunchyroll simulcasting the series.

Eight pieces of theme music are used for the series. For the first twelve episodes, the opening theme is "Colorful Box" performed by Yoko Ishida, while the ending theme is "Animetic Love Letter" sung by Juri Kimura, Haruka Yoshimura, and Haruka Chisuga. For episode one, the opening theme is  sung by Tracy (Mai Nakahara, Shizuka Itō, and Ai Kayano), which is later used as the opening theme for the first OVA episode. For episodes 13 onwards, the second opening theme is  performed by Masami Okui, while the second ending theme is  performed by Donuts Quintet (Juri Kimura, Haruka Yoshimura, Haruka Chisuga, Asami Takano, and Hitomi Ōwada).

Episode list

OVAs

References

External links
 

Shirobako